Hermann Wilhelm Souchon (2 January 1895 – 1982) was a German Naval officer and the suspected murderer, according to the testimonies of two accomplices, of Rosa Luxemburg on 15 January 1919 in Berlin.

Biography 
Souchon, a nephew of Admiral Wilhelm Souchon, was born in Bromberg, Province of Posen (Bydgoscz, Poland). He served in the First World War as lieutenant in an artillery regiment. In 1915, he went to the Imperial Navy as an ensign. After the end of the war, he was discharged and became a member of Marinebrigade Ehrhardt. This Freikorps  was active in Berlin in January 1919, as part of the Garde-Kavallerie-Schützen-Division under General Lieutenant Heinrich von Hofmann.

On 15 January 1919, Rosa Luxemburg and Karl Liebknecht were captured at Berlin-Wilmersdorf by the Garde-Kavallerie-Schützendivision and brought to their headquarters at Hotel Eden. Captain Waldemar Pabst, along with Horst von Pflugk-Harttung questioned them and gave the order to execute them. When they were being transported, Souchon jumped onto the car. He is one of two people accused of having shot Luxemburg in the head after Otto Runge had knocked her down with a rifle butt.

In 1920, he flew to Finland where he worked as a bank clerk and became a sympathizer of the Lapua Movement.

After Hitler had granted amnesty to those involved in the murders of Liebknecht and Luxemburg, Souchon returned to Germany in 1935 and joined the Luftwaffe, where he rose to the rank of colonel (Oberst) during the war.  After the war he lived in Bad Godesberg.

When a documentary report on the Liebknecht-Luxemburg story was first shown in 1969 on German television ARD, Souchon with his lawyer Otto Kranzbühler sued the broadcaster, which had to retract their statement of Souchon's guilt in February 1970. Since the 1980s, the documentary has been shown again a few times and is now publicly available.

Further reading 

 Elisabeth Hannover-Drück, Heinrich Hannover: Der Mord an Rosa Luxemburg und Karl Liebknecht. Suhrkamp, Frankfurt 1967.

References

External links 
 Die Mörder Rosa Luxemburgs. In: Geo Epoche, Nr. 27,  August 2007
 Der Feind im Inneren, Wolfram Wette

1890s births
1982 deaths
Military personnel from Bydgoszcz
People from the Province of Posen
Imperial German Navy personnel of World War I
Luftwaffe personnel of World War II
German assassins
20th-century Freikorps personnel
German Army personnel of World War I